Jogendra Nath Hazarika (9 September 1924 - 1998) was an Indian politician who served as the Chief Minister of Assam from 9 September 1979 to 11 December 1979. He was elected to the Lok Sabha, lower house of the Parliament of India from the Dibrugarh constituency, Assam in 1951, 1957, 1962 and 1967. He was also a Member of the Assam Legislative Assembly and Speaker of the Assam Legislative Assembly.

Early life
Hazarika was born in September 1924 in Tengakhat Mawza, Lakhimpur District (now Dibrugarh District) in Assam. His family were Sonowal Kacharis. He attended school in his home town, and in 1949 he graduated and subsequently completed an L.L.B. from University of Calcutta.

References

External links
 Official biographical sketch in Parliament of India website

1924 births
Year of death missing
India MPs 1952–1957
India MPs 1957–1962
India MPs 1962–1967
India MPs 1967–1970
Chief ministers from Janata Party
Chief Ministers of Assam
Indian National Congress (Organisation) politicians
Indian National Congress politicians
Janata Party politicians
Lok Sabha members from Assam
Members of the Assam Legislative Assembly
People from Dibrugarh district
Speakers of the Assam Legislative Assembly